Coal Valley is an unincorporated community in Logan County, West Virginia, United States.

It is in the Logan Coalfield region.

References 

Unincorporated communities in Logan County, West Virginia
Logan Coalfield
Unincorporated communities in West Virginia